Euljiro is an avenue in Seoul named after Eulji Mundeok, the general who saved Korea from the invading Sui dynasty of China. During the period of Japanese rule, the street was known as Kogane-Cho (황금정; 黄金町).

Euljiro starts at 97-3 Sogong-dong, Jung-gu, Seoul (서울 중구 소공동), and reaches 224-2, Sindang-dong, Jung-gu (중구 신당동), and is the name of Beopjeong-dong (법정동).

Transportation links
Euljiro has several links to Seoul Subway Line 2:
Euljiro 1-ga Station
Euljiro 3-ga Station
Euljiro 4-ga Station

References

Neighbourhoods of Jung-gu, Seoul
Geography of Seoul
Streets in Seoul
Tourist attractions in Seoul